Alex Cooper may refer to:

 Alex Cooper (architect), American architect
 Alex Cooper (footballer), Scottish footballer
 Alex Cooper (sailor), sailor from Bermuda

See also
 Trapped: The Alex Cooper Story, a 2019 American biographical drama television film
 Alexander Cooper, English Baroque miniature painter
 Alexandra Cooper, host of Call Her Daddy podcast.